Walter Moras (Jan. 20, 1856 - March 6, 1925) was a German landscape painter who specialized to some extent in winter scenes.

Life

Moras was significantly influenced by the marine and landscape painter Hermann Eschke (1823-1900). In Berlin, where Moras was born, he gained his artistic training in Eschke's studio. In 1876, the young Moras staged his first exhibition, at the Prussian Academy of Arts in Berlin. Thereafter, Moras's works were continually shown, in small numbers, at major Berlin art exhibits. Moras also participated in exhibits in Bremen, Oldenburg and Munich.

At Eschke's recommendation, the young Moras painted scenes in Mecklenburg and on the large, craggy German island of Rügen. He also painted in Norway, the Netherlands and Italy. However, many of his works were created in rural Brandenburg and later in the Spreewald, both in the region of Berlin. He scarcely painted at all in Berlin itself, even though was described as a "Berlin painter" all his life.

Moras's style was realistic, influenced by a touch of melancholia, and generally simple and refined. Some of his evocative landscapes show Impressionistic influences. In later years he was known for large-format autumnal scenes illuminated by warm fall colors.

His numerous winter landscapes, which were composed with great attention to detail, similarly showed warmer hues amid the snowy context.

Moras was not a member of the Berlin Artists Association, nor did he become involved with any of the north German artists' colonies, though he sometimes painted in their neighborhoods.

In 1882 he married Ida Baluschek, the daughter of a Berlin railroad designer. Their son, Bruno, was born in 1883; Bruno Moras would also become a painter, but he was ever overshadowed by the reputation of his father.

Selected paintings

Further reading 

 Irmgard Wirth: Berliner Malerei im 19. Jahrhundert. Von der Zeit Friedrichs des Großen bis zum Ersten Weltkrieg. Siedler Verlag, Berlin 1990, S. 391–398, . 
 Friedrich von Bötticher: Malerwerke des 19. Jahrhunderts. Beitrag zur Kunstgeschichte. Pantheon-Verlag, Leipzig 1941, S. 73. 
 Alfried Nehring: Walter Moras. Spuren eines Malerlebens; aus der Blütezeit der Freilichtmalerei. Klatschmohn Verlag, Bentwisch 2010, . 
 Alfried Nehring: Hermann Eschke. Klippen und Küsten; ein Urgestein der Berliner Malerei im 19. Jahrhundert. Klatschmohn Verlag, Bentwisch 2012, S. 50–53, .

External links 

 Walter Moras at Artnet
 Alfried Nehring: private website on Walter Moras. Seine Landschaften. Sein Leben
 Walter Moras at HAMPEL-Auktionen
 "Rätsel um Maler Walter Moras offenbar gelöst". In: Lausitzer Rundschau 3 April 2007

1856 births
1925 deaths
Artists from Berlin
19th-century German painters
19th-century German male artists
German male painters
20th-century German painters
20th-century German male artists
German landscape painters